Kasner is a surname. Notable people with the surname include:
Angela Merkel, née Kasner (born 1954), German Chancellor
Edward Kasner (1878–1955), American mathematician, Tutor on Mathematics in the Columbia University Mathematics Department
Marliese Kasner (born Marliese Miller) (born 1982), Canadian curler from Canwood, Saskatchewan
Stephen Kasner (1970–2019), painter, illustrator, musician, photographer, graphic artist, and magician

See also
 Kasner metric, an exact solution to Einstein's theory of general relativity
 Kasner polygon of a polygon  is the polygon whose vertices are the midpoints of the edges of 
 Kasner's dwarf burrowing skink (Scelotes kasneri) is a species of skink in the family Scincidae
 Kassner

German-language surnames